Whakatane High School is a secondary school located in the town of Whakatane, New Zealand. As of 2022, the school has a roll of 1067 students and aims to offer every student an equal opportunity to succeed with strong values around responsibility, respect and achievement. Whakatane High School has a 100-year history as a co-educational public high school, opening in 1920 as Whakatane District High School, becoming a full high school in 1950. The school held its centennial on 2–3 April 2021, postponed from 2020.

History

Whakatane High School is 100 years old, opening in 1920 as Whakatane District High School, becoming a full high school in 1950. In 1973, as the population of Whakatane neared 10000, Trident High School was opened

Facilities and buildings
The school consists of a field, gymnasium (a separate gymnastics building operated by the local Gymnastics Club lies next to it), school & student office, Careers Centre, the Barclay Hall, a library (named in November 2011 after New Zealand author Margaret Mahy, who went to Whakatane High School for a period of time), and numerous buildings split into blocks including: N block (Mainly used for Math, and Computer sciences), T Block (Mainly used for Technology), B Block (Mainly for English, Social Studies and related subjects), A block (Multiple subjects including Languages and Health), C Block (Mainly for art and related subjects) and L Block (Mainly for science and related subjects).

Students
As of the 1st of February 2022, the total school roll is 1067 students. 45.64% of the students are European / Pākehā, 48.08% are Māori, 1.12% are Pacific, 3.09% Identify as Asian, 0.94 are classified as MELAA, and 1.12% are registered as Other. There were no International students as of the first of February, 2022.

Houses
Students at Whakatane High School are split into one of four houses. Each house is named after a tree that is native to New Zealand. Students compete in school-related sporting and cultural events to win points for their house. At the end of the year, one house is named champion for that year. The houses are represented by a colour and are listed below:
Matai 
Kauri 
Totara 
Rimu

Notable alumni

Lisa Carrington, Canoe Sprint World Champion, Olympic gold medalist
Richard James Conway, New Zealand rugby union player
Karen Hanlen, Oceania mountain bike champion
John Vernon Head QSM, Anti-landmines activist
Toni Jeffs, New Zealand swimmer
Jozef Klaassen, Member of Nederlands Olympic Eight at 2012 London Games
Jaimee Lovett, New Zealand canoeist
Margaret Mahy, author
Benji Marshall, rugby league player
Noel Mills, former New Zealand rower, Olympic silver medalist
Ian Shearer, former National MP
Brett Sinkinson, rugby union player
Paul Steel, New Zealand squash player
Sir Alan Stewart, founding vice-chancellor, Massey University
Jon-Paul Tobin, New Zealand windsurfer 
Nathan Twaddle, world champion rower and Olympic bronze medalist
Wybo Veldman, former New Zealand rower, Olympic gold medalist
Stacey Waaka, New Zealand rugby union player

References

External links
School Website

Whakatāne
Secondary schools in the Bay of Plenty Region